Calamus thwaitesii is a species of  rattan palm in the family Arecaceae. It is native to Southwest India and Sri Lanka.

References 

thwaitesii
Flora of India (region)